Srihan Anuruddhika (born 3 March 1993) is a Sri Lankan cricketer. He made his first-class debut for Negombo Cricket Club in Tier B of the 2017–18 Premier League Tournament on 21 December 2017.

References

External links
 

1993 births
Living people
Sri Lankan cricketers
Negombo Cricket Club cricketers
People from Negombo